The Girl at Home is a 1917 American drama silent film directed by Marshall Neilan and written by Beulah Marie Dix and George Middleton. The film stars Vivian Martin, Jack Pickford, James Neill, Olga Grey, Edythe Chapman and William Elmer. The film was released on April 26, 1917, by Paramount Pictures.

Plot

Cast 
Vivian Martin as Jean Hilton
Jack Pickford as Jimmie Dexter
James Neill as Squire Padgate
Olga Grey as Diana Parish
Edythe Chapman as Mary Dexter
William Elmer as Detective Hagen

Preservation status
The film is preserved in the Library of Congress collection.

References

External links 
 
 

1917 films
1910s English-language films
Silent American drama films
1917 drama films
Paramount Pictures films
Films directed by Marshall Neilan
American black-and-white films
American silent feature films
1910s American films